A system basis chip (SBC) is an integrated circuit that includes various functions of automotive electronic control units (ECU) on a single die.

It typically includes a mixture between digital standard functionality like communication bus interfaces and analog or power functionality, denoted as smart power. Therefore SBCs are based on special smart power technology platforms.

The embedded functions may include:
 Voltage regulators
 Supervision functions
 Reset generators, 
 Watchdog functions
 Bus interfaces, like Local Interconnect Network (LIN), CAN bus or others
 Wake-up logic
 Power switches

The complexity range for SBC starts with rather simple hardwired devices to configurable state-machine controlled devices (e.g. through a serial peripheral interface).

Various major automotive semiconductor manufacturers offer SBCs.

References 

Integrated circuits